Vicente Estavillo (born 17 May 1955) is a Uruguayan former football striker.

Estavillo played for C.A. Peñarol and Montevideo Wanderers F.C., then he moved to Greece and played for Olympiacos F.C. He was the hero of 1982 Greek Championship as he scored the first goal against Panathinaikos (2-1 title match in Volos). The next year Estavillo scored the winning goal against Panathinaikos in match in near the end of the 1983 Greek Championship giving to Olympiakos the opportunity to win the Greek Championship as he did. He also played for PAS Giannina.

Estavillo then moved to Australia where he played in the National Soccer League for Sydney Olympic.

Estavillo became the manager of Cerro Largo in December 2007.

References

External links 
Vicente Estavillio bluevayeros.gr
Interview for PAS Giannina fans (greek)
Olympiakos titles (Estavillo the hero of 1982 and 1983 championships) (greek)

1955 births
Living people
People from Melo, Uruguay
Uruguayan footballers
Uruguayan expatriate footballers
Super League Greece players
Peñarol players
Montevideo Wanderers F.C. players
National Soccer League (Australia) players
National Soccer League (Australia) coaches
Olympiacos F.C. players
Expatriate footballers in Greece
Expatriate soccer players in Australia
PAS Giannina F.C. players
Cerro Largo F.C. managers
Association football forwards
Uruguayan football managers